The Dilli Haat - INA metro station is an interchange station between the Yellow Line and Pink Line of the Delhi Metro. It serves INA Colony, the Dilli Haat complex, and nearby busy markets, INA Market, and the Sarojini Nagar Market.

The station as part of the Yellow Line was opened to public on 3 September 2010. It became an interchange station, on opening of the Pink Line on 6 August 2018.

The station
The station have Pink line platform at first level followed by a concourse which will lead to existing platform of the Yellow line.

Station layout

Entry/Exit

Connections

Bus
Delhi Transport Corporation bus routes number at Kidwai Nagar 505, 433, 624ALinkSTL, 460, 502, 548CL, 568, 460CL, 578, 588, 569, 794, 516, 433CL serves the station.

See also
Delhi
List of Delhi Metro stations
Transport in Delhi
Delhi Metro Rail Corporation
Delhi Suburban Railway
Inner Ring Road, Delhi
South Extension
Delhi Monorail
Delhi Transport Corporation
South Delhi
New Delhi
National Capital Region (India)
List of rapid transit systems
List of metro systems

References

External links

 Delhi Metro Rail Corporation Ltd. (Official site)
 Delhi Metro Annual Reports
 
 UrbanRail.Net – Descriptions of all metro systems in the world, each with a schematic map showing all stations.

Delhi Metro stations
Railway stations opened in 2010
Railway stations in South Delhi district
2010 establishments in Delhi